Jacob Albertus Marais (2 November 1922 – 8 August 2000) was an Afrikaner nationalist thinker, author, politician, Member of Parliament, and leader of the Herstigte Nasionale Party (HNP) from 1977 to his death in 2000. Marais is the longest serving head of any political party in Afrikaner history, with a term of 23 years.

Early life and family history
During the Second Boer War, Marais's paternal grandmother was the leader of a group of Boer women who for 18 months roamed about the western Transvaal and western Free State with their young children so as to avoid capture by British forces. His father, Jaap Sr., and paternal grandfather, Sarel Jacobus Stefanus, was in active service on the Western front with the Bothaville commando. Both were made prisoner of war after Boer general Piet Cronjé's surrender at the Battle of Paardeberg. Father Jaap Sr. was sent to Broadbottom Camp at St. Helena, whilst grandfather Sarel was held at Green Point, after which he received "parole" due to illness. He died a month after the end of the war. Marais's mother, together with her mother and siblings, was interned at the Klerksdorp concentration camp.

Jaap Marais was one of nine children, six sons and two daughters, of whom one brother died in infancy. Marais grew up on the farm Maraisdeel ("Marais’s share") in the district of Vryburg. It originally formed part of a larger farm, Donkerpoort ("Dark gap or gateway" – such as a gap in a mountain range), which belonged to his grandfather Sarel. With his younger brother Jan he attended a local farm school. Marais matriculated in 1940 at Vryburg Hoërskool. With tensions simmering between Afrikaner nationalism and British nationalism during the Second World War, Marais and a number of his classmates organized a "strike" on 10 October 1940, on account of it being the birthday of former president and bastion of Boer independence, Paul Kruger.

After school Marais enrolled at the Hoër Handelskool in Potchefstroom, where he received a National Diploma in 1942.

Political life

Early years
Marais was active in Afrikaner nationalist politics from his twenties onwards.

Member of Parliament (1958-1969)
He was elected as a Member of Parliament for the ruling National Party in 1958 and served until 1969. The HNP was formed in 1969 by Albert Hertzog (son of former Prime Minister General JBM Hertzog), a cabinet minister, Marais, and two other MPs, Louis Stofberg and Willie Marais. The founding of the party occurred three years after the assassination of Hendrik Verwoerd, when his successor BJ Vorster authorised the presence of Māori players and spectators during the tour of New Zealand rugby union team in South Africa in 1970. Marais considered this measure as a concession under pressure that would result in other concessions until the whole political order in South Africa (at the time based on racial and cultural differentiation, separate group areas, and white rule) had been dismantled. Jaap Marais was thrown out of the Broederbond shortly after the HNP was formed, and all other identified HNP members or sympathisers were also purged from the Broederbond.

Fighting against concession, and the founding of the Herstigte Nasionale Party (1969-1982)
The HNP found it difficult to make headway against the entrenched and relatively conservative ruling National Party in the 1970s. It succeeded in winning 14% of the vote in the white parliamentary elections of 1981. However, it did not gain any seats due to the electoral system, which was based on a Westminster system of electoral districts rather than a proportional system. Its electoral growth played a role in encouraging the breaking-away from the National Party in 1982 of the Conservative Party under Andries Treurnicht.

Fighting against reform and the dismantling of Apartheid (1982-1994)

Under the leadership of Marais, the HNP challenged the policy of the National Party to negotiate with the African National Congress and South African Communist Party. He tried in vain to obtain the co-operation of the CP. He proposed a Volksfront, being a coalition of all the right-wing organisations with one objective; to stop president FW De Klerk from handing over the reins of government to the African National Congress. Instead, in 1992, a Volksfront was created from the ranks of the Conservative Party, and after 1993 led by Constand Viljoen.

In July 1993, in an open letter, Marais demanded a whites-only election from president De Klerk. In the same letter, Marais put it to De Klerk that Afrikaners did not give De Klerk a mandate in the March 1992 referendum "for their downfall and suicide". Marais wrote to De Klerk that "hundreds of thousands of Afrikaners regarded De Klerk's actions as treason, and are "disgusted by the fall of moral standards and political deceit which [De Klerk’s] regime represented". Marais was of the opinion that De Klerk would lose "every by-election in the run up to a general election" in which De Klerk and the National Party "would be smashed".  In September 1993 Marais repeated his request, again by open letter. This time Marais accused De Klerk and his cronies of being "retarded (slow) communists", in the sense that they were handing concession after concession to the ANC/SACP alliance. Marais further rhetorically asked De Klerk: "How would a "hidden" communist South African head of state have acted differently than you have done since February 1990?"

Resistance in the New South Africa (1994-2000)
After the country’s first non-racial democratic elections on 27 April 1994, which constituted the birth of the new South Africa, Marais’s HNP maintained a policy of non-participation in the formal political and electoral system. Marais propagated the rhyming motto Kies Reg: Bly Weg!, which translates as "Decide/vote Correct: Stay Away!"

In an email teeming with spelling errors, addressed to Oom Jaap niksdoen ("Uncle Jaap Do-nothing") Solidariteit's Flip Buys, then at the Mine Workers' Union, as the former was still known, accused Marais personally of slander and defamation against Bruwer, Hartzenberg and Viljoen, who Buys regarded as "men who sacrifices everything for their People". Buys further expressed his wish that Marais's "role in the dismantling of our People" be "laid bare in court". Marais replied: "Your letter is an interesting experience. I have never before dealt with a case where a writer's level of ignorance is exceeded so clearly by the degree of his rudeness."

Today, the party still does not recognise the right of the African National Congress government to rule over Afrikaners in South Africa. The party also has not relinquished its claim to the previously white-dominated part of South Africa. It continues to encourage its supporters not to vote, as part of its policy of resistance.

Jaap Marais claimed that it was the British and not the National Party of 1948 who had invented apartheid. "Is it asking too much of English-speaking South Africans to acknowledge this evident truth?" Marais, who up to his death held to Verwoerdian apartheid ideology, wrote in the "Sunday Independent." Marais also demanded an apology from then UK prime minister Tony Blair for Britain's conduct during the Anglo Boer War of 1899–1902, when it had instituted concentration camps in which 27,000 Boer civilians perished (24,000 children and 3,000 women). Blair didn't give an apology.

Private life
Marais became engaged to Marie Rautenbach in 1957, and the two were married on 6 January 1959 in Patensie. They had two daughters, Marjorié and Karina, and a son, Japie.

Marais had an affinity for the work of Afrikaans poets N.P. van Wyk Louw and D.J. Opperman, as well as those of the Dutch and Flemish poets Marnix Gijsen, Henriette Roland Holst, Hendrik Marsman, and Martinus Nijhoff. His favourite English poetry was that of Roy Campbell, T. S. Eliot and John Keats, the latter of whom he described as "evergreen". During the 1950s, Marais translated William Shakespeare's Julius Caesar into Afrikaans.

Marais was an avid breeder of budgerigars.

Political views

Marais exercised influence as a thinker in rightwing Afrikaner nationalist circles from the 1970s to the 1990s. His thinking was influenced by Hans Strijdom and Hendrik Verwoerd, two Afrikaner nationalist leaders and prime ministers of South Africa. He wrote a political biography of Hendrik Verwoerd and many political articles and booklets. In his writings and speeches, Marais often referred to Richard Weaver, C.J. Langenhoven, Tobie Muller, James Burnham, Alexis de Tocqueville, Edmund Burke, G.K. Chesterton, Alain de Benoist, Oswald Spengler, Arnold J. Toynbee, Ludwig von Mises, F.A. von Hayek and Ortega y Gasset.

Marais considered identity, continuity, and freedom as the three key themes of Afrikaner nationalism. He emphasized that identity rested on each group's preference for its own. Such a group preference implied a related right among members of the group to differentiate and discriminate to exercise a group's preference. Among each people, according to Marais, there was a center of authority that determined who was included and excluded. In the case of Afrikaners, their centers of authority ensured that a racial preference for whites, the Afrikaans language, a distinctive Western culture, traditions and history had formed the Afrikaner identity in southern Africa.

According to Marais, continuity depended on each generation maintaining what had been built up by previous generations and transferring it to the next generation. He emphasized Afrikaners' freedom struggle against foreign domination by British imperialism in the Anglo Boer War, but also against American or Soviet Russian forces during the Cold War or the greater numbers of various black ethnic peoples in South Africa. In his view, this freedom was linked to the fatherland of Afrikaners, which he defined as South Africa minus the Asian and Coloured group areas and the various black ethnic homelands.

Publications

Books
.
.
.
.
.
.
.
.

Further reading

References

External links
 Jaap Marais remembered as "one of Bittereinders" – Dispatch Online. Last visited 27 December 2007.

1922 births
2000 deaths
20th-century South African politicians
20th-century translators
Afrikaner nationalists
Herstigte Nasionale Party politicians
Members of the House of Assembly (South Africa)
Members of the Reformed Churches in South Africa
National Party (South Africa) politicians
People from Vryburg
Transvaal people
South African anti-communists
South African people of Dutch descent
South African people of German descent
Translators to Afrikaans